A Multi-Purpose "Sialkot Sports Complex" is under construction at  Kotli Mir Ali on Sialkot-Daska Road in Sialkot, Punjab, Pakistan under the supervision of Sialkot District Government and Pakistan Sports Board. During  the first phase of this grand project an international standard Tartan track facility for athletics, Squash courts, volleyball and basketball courts would also be constructed in the Multi-Purpose Sports Complex which would have 49000 seating capacity.

First phase would be completed in a period of 18 months with an estimated cost of Rs.1240 million while a gymnasium would also be constructed there with a cost of Rs.1229 million.

See also
Jinnah Stadium Sialkot
Sialkot Hockey Stadium

References
 http://pakistantimes.net/2004/06/01/metro.htm

Buildings and structures in Sialkot
Athletics (track and field) venues in Pakistan
Sports venues in Pakistan
Stadiums under construction
Sport in Sialkot